Hardscrabble Mountain is a summit located in Custer County, Colorado with an elevation of . It is one of the peaks in Wet Mountains, a sub-range of the Sangre de Cristo Range of the Rocky Mountains. A local legend is that the mountain was named after an event from Christmas Day 1855. Ute Native Americans attacked settlers in Pueblo, after which soldiers pursued the Utes. They ran up the creek and had a “hard scrabble” to avoid being captured.

Four streams are found in the Hardscrabble Mountain and Wetmore area:
 North Hardscrabble Creek
 Middle Hardscrabble Creek
 South Fork North Hardscrabble Creek
 South Hardscrabble Creek start at Hardscrabble Mountain.

Other nearby geological sites are:
 South Hardscrabble Park, a flat south of Hardscrabble Mountain
 Hardscrabble Pass, west-southwest of the mountain

References

External links
 Hardscrabble Mountain, Topographical map

Sangre de Cristo Mountains
Landforms of Custer County, Colorado